Robert Raymond Robins (born October 17, 1981) is a former American professional ice hockey forward. He played for the Boston Bruins in the National Hockey League (NHL).

Playing career

Robins spent four seasons of Division 1 collegiate hockey at the University of Massachusetts Lowell before signing an  NHL contract with the Ottawa Senators in 2006. He was assigned to the Binghamton Senators of the American Hockey League and spent two seasons there. He then was assigned to the ECHL with the Elmira Jackals and also had short spells with the Rochester Americans, Albany River Rats and the Syracuse Crunch of the American Hockey League. In 2008, Robins headed to Europe and signed with the Belfast Giants of the Elite Ice Hockey League in the United Kingdom.

Robins signed with the Rødovre Mighty Bulls of the AL-Bank Ligaen Danish Hockey League for the 2009–10 season but the contract was annulled due to financial difficulties with Rødovre.  Robins then signed with HK Acroni Jesenice in the Austrian Hockey League and finished the season there.

Robins returned to the United States for the 2010–11 hockey season to play with the Bakersfield Condors of the ECHL. On September 22, 2011, the Condors traded Robins to the Chicago Express in exchange for future considerations. He was then loaned to the AHL's Abbotsford Heat and Providence Bruins and eventually signed a contract with the Bruins for the remainder of the 2011-2012 season.

Robins signed an American Hockey League contract with the Providence Bruins for the 2012-13 season. On July 5, 2013, he signed a two-year, two-way NHL contract by the Boston Bruins.

During the 2014-2015 season, the second year of his contract with the Bruins, Robins made his NHL debut on October 8, 2014, against the Philadelphia Flyers, and had his first NHL fight against Flyers defenseman Luke Schenn. After three games, Robins was waived for the purpose of reassignment to the Providence Bruins of the American Hockey League.

Robins announced his retirement due to concussion on July 9, 2015.

Personal
Robins runs and writes a blog at www.bobbyrobins.com. His mother is part Filipino and his father is an American of European descent.

Career statistics

References

External links

1981 births
Living people
Abbotsford Heat players
Albany River Rats players
American expatriate ice hockey players in Slovenia
American men's ice hockey centers
American sportspeople of Filipino descent
Bakersfield Condors (1998–2015) players
Belfast Giants players
Binghamton Senators players
Boston Bruins players
Chicago Express players
Elmira Jackals (ECHL) players
American expatriate ice hockey players in Northern Ireland
HK Acroni Jesenice players
Ice hockey players from Wisconsin
People from Peshtigo, Wisconsin
Providence Bruins players
Rochester Americans players
Syracuse Crunch players
Tri-City Storm players
UMass Lowell River Hawks men's ice hockey players
Undrafted National Hockey League players
American expatriate ice hockey players in Canada